is the primary kabuki theatre in Kyoto, Japan. The current building, with a 1,086 seat capacity, was built in 1929.

History
The Minami-za is one of the earliest of the seven officially-licensed kabuki theatres built in the early Edo period (1615-1623) in the Shijo Kawara area in Kyoto; the theatre pre-dates those of Tokyo and Osaka. The current Minami-za theatre was built in 1929 in the architectural style of the Momoyama period, with a gabled roof and a traditional turret marking the official approval of the government. In 1991, after the end of the Shōwa period, the interior was drastically refurbished and modern stage mechanism was installed.

In 1996, the Minami-za was registered as a Japanese Tangible Cultural Property in respects to its historical architectural value in connection to the city of Kyoto.

Theatre mechanism

References

External links 
Official site 

Kabuki theatres
Buildings and structures in Kyoto
Tourist attractions in Kyoto
Registered Monuments of Japan